is a short story by Japanese writer Ichiyō Higuchi first published in 1894. It tells the story of a young housemaid, Omine, who embezzles money from her employers to help a sick relative.

Plot
Omine works as a maid in the strict household of Mrs. Yamamura, the rigid wife of a wealthy Tokyo businessman. On her day off shortly before New Year's Eve, she pays a visit to her uncle Yasubei, who raised Omine after the death of her parents. Yasubei has fallen ill and was forced to close down his food store and move into a smaller flat with his family. He begs Omine to keep her job, which she contemplated quitting, and asks her to lend him money, as he is indebted to a loan shark whom he must pay on the thirty-first of the month. Also, he wants to buy his little son Sannosuke some traditional New Year's rice cakes. Omine agrees to help, announcing that she will ask Mrs. Yamamura either for a loan or an advance on her salary, and tells Yasubei to send Sannosuke at noon on the thirty-first to collect the money. 

On the thirty-first, Ishinosuke, Mr. Yamamura's careless son from a previous marriage, shows up after a drunken night at his parents' house, to the consternation of the other family members. Omine reminds Mrs. Yamamura of the advance she had been willing to pay, but her employer pretends not to remember having made such an offer. Out of desperation, Omine steals two yen from a drawer and gives it to the waiting Sannosuke. Knowing that the money in the household will be counted on this last evening of the year, she fears the moment her embezzlement will be revealed, and even contemplates suicide. Fortunately, Ishinosuke has taken the remaining money from the drawer, thus obliterating all traces of Omine's misdemeanour. Omine speculates if Ishinosuke's action was by pure chance and simply for his own purposes, or if he had witnessed her theft and taken the remaining money to protect her.

Publication history
On the Last Day of the Year first appeared in the December 1894 edition of Bungakukai magazine and was reprinted in Tayo magazine in 1896. Generally regarded today as "the first of a series of masterpieces" from Higuchi, according to her biographer Timothy J. Van Compernolle, it initially met with little attention and some unfavourable reviews. Biographer and translator Robert Lyons Danly points out a bleak tone and new realism missing in many of her earlier stories.

Translations
On the Last Day of the Year was translated into English in 1903 by Tei Fujiu as The Last Day of the Year in the anthology Hanakatsura: The Works of Famous Literary Women in Japan, and again in 1981 by Robert Lyons Danly.

Adaptations
It was also adapted for Japanese television in 1959.

References

Bibliography
 

1894 short stories
Japanese short stories
Japanese short stories adapted into films
Works by Japanese writers
Literature by women
Meiji period in fiction